Adult Contemporary is a chart published by Billboard ranking the top-performing songs in the United States in the adult contemporary music (AC) market.  In 2016, nine different songs topped the chart in 53 issues of the magazine, based on weekly airplay data from radio stations compiled by Nielsen Broadcast Data Systems.

On the first chart of the year, British musician Seal moved into the number one position with his version of the 1970 song "This Christmas", displacing "Hello" by Adele.  The following week, "Hello" regained the top spot and held it for 16 consecutive weeks, the year's longest unbroken run atop the chart.  Adele would return to number one for two weeks later in the year with "Send My Love (To Your New Lover)", and her total of 18 weeks in the top spot during 2016 was the most for any artist.  She was the only act to take more than one song to the top of the AC listing during the year.  In March, the BBC described Adele as the biggest star in pop music at the time.

From the issues of Billboard dated July 9 through November 26, the top spot was occupied by two songs from film soundtracks.  Justin Timberlake spent 13 weeks at number one beginning in the July 9 issue with "Can't Stop the Feeling!" from the film Trolls, before Pink had a six-week run in the top spot with "Just like Fire", from Alice Through the Looking Glass.  Timberlake's song returned to the top of the chart in November for two further weeks.  It was the singer's first AC number one as a solo artist, although he had topped the listing 16 years earlier as a member of the group NSYNC with their song "This I Promise You".  Having begun with one version of "This Christmas" atop the chart, 2016 ended with a different version of the song in the top position.  The band Train took its version of the song to number one in the issue of Billboard dated December 17, yielded the top spot the following week to Josh Groban with his recording of "Have Yourself a Merry Little Christmas", but returned to number one in the final issue of the year.  The two songs continued a trend of Christmas-themed songs topping the AC chart at the end of the year, reflecting the fact that adult contemporary radio stations usually switch to playing exclusively festive songs in December.

Chart history

See also
2016 in American music

References

2016
Number-one adult contemporary singles
United States Adult Contemporary